Puente Viejo ("Old Bridge") is the second oldest and second lowest of the three bridges that span the  deep chasm that carries the Guadalevín River and divides the city of Ronda in southern Spain. Despite its name ('Old bridge'), it is newer than the Puente Romano ('Roman bridge'). It was built in 1616, and currently only carries pedestrian traffic.

See also
Puente Nuevo
Puente Romano
Ronda
Guadalevín

Bridges in Andalusia
Pedestrian bridges in Spain
Bridges completed in 1616
1616 establishments in Spain

Comprehensive tourist information about Ronda in English